Rosemarie Gabriel ( Kother, born 27 February 1956) is a retired German swimmer. She competed at the 1972 and 1976 Summer Olympics in five events in total and won a gold medal in the 4 × 100 m medley relay in 1976, swimming for the East German team in a preliminary round. Individually, she won a bronze medal in the 200 m butterfly in 1976.

Between 1973 and 1975 she won seven gold and two silver medals in the 100 m and 200 m butterfly and 4 × 100 m medley relay at the world and European championships. She also set eleven world records: 
three in the 100 m butterfly (1974),
five in the 200 m butterfly (1973, 1976),
two in the 4 × 100 m medley relay (1973, 1974) and 
one in the 4 × 100 m freestyle relay (1976).

In 1986, she was inducted to the International Swimming Hall of Fame.

After being inducted into the International Swimming Hall of Fame, team officials confessed to administering performance enhancing drugs to this swimmer, who therefore obtained an illegal and unfair advantage over other athletes.

She retired from competitions in 1976 and studied physiotherapy. In 1990 she founded her own company Praxis Gabriel in Berlin, which in 2000 was joined by her daughter Linda (born ca. 1981).

See also
 List of members of the International Swimming Hall of Fame

References

1956 births
Living people
Sportspeople from Schwerin
People from Bezirk Schwerin
German female swimmers
Female butterfly swimmers
Olympic swimmers of East Germany
Swimmers at the 1972 Summer Olympics
Swimmers at the 1976 Summer Olympics
Olympic gold medalists for East Germany
Olympic bronze medalists for East Germany
Olympic bronze medalists in swimming
World Aquatics Championships medalists in swimming
European Aquatics Championships medalists in swimming
Medalists at the 1976 Summer Olympics
Olympic gold medalists in swimming
Recipients of the Patriotic Order of Merit in silver
20th-century German women